The Hollow is a 2004 teen horror film, starring Kevin Zegers, Kaley Cuoco, Nick Carter and Stacy Keach. The film premiered on the ABC Family channel, on October 24, 2004.

Plot
The Hollow tells the story of Ian Cranston, a high school teen who has just found out he is the descendant of Ichabod Crane. With the help of his girlfriend Karen, a local bully named Brody, and the old cemetery caretaker Claus Van Ripper, Ian now must stop the newly resurrected Headless Horseman.

Cast 
 Kevin Zegers as Ian Cranston
 Kaley Cuoco as Karen
 Nick Carter as Brody
 Ben Scott as the Headless Horseman
 Stacy Keach as Claus Van Ripper
 Judge Reinhold as Carl Cranston
 Lisa Chess as Helen Cranston
 Nicholas Turturro as Sheriff Duncan
 Eileen Brennan as Joan Van Etten
 Joseph Mazzello as Scott
 Shelley Bennett as Erica
 Melissa Schuman as Amber
 Zen Gesner as Marcus
 Natalia Nogulich as Nancy Worthen
 Blake Shields as Rob

Alternate versions 
When it premiered in October 2004 on ABC Family channel The Hollow was trimmed slightly to eliminate the violence of the Headless Horseman's attacks, and several of the lines had to be re-dubbed to eliminate promiscuous references and graphic profanity.  The entire sequence of Rob and Erica's liaison and attack had several different cuts. Rob's severed head was also edited out of frame.  The deaths of Erica, Sheriff Duncan, and Marcus were toned down slightly eliminating their bodies' blood flow, but leaving the sound of the Horseman's sword slashing at their throats.  Karen's discovery of all the severed heads also had an alternate shot to not show the gore dripping from them.

2015 Movie 
Another movie named The Hollow  has been shown on the Syfy Channel. This movie is not a remake, and has a completely different plot.

References

External links 

2004 films
2004 horror films
American teen horror films
ABC Family original films
Films based on The Legend of Sleepy Hollow
Films directed by Kyle Newman
Films produced by Mason Novick
Halloween horror films
2000s American films